This is a list of power metal bands including notable bands that have at some point in their careers played power metal or heavily contributed to the genre's development. Power metal is a subgenre of heavy metal music combining characteristics of traditional metal with speed metal, often within symphonic context. Generally, power metal is characterized by a more uplifting sound, in contrast to the heaviness and dissonance prevalent in styles such as doom metal and death metal. Power metal bands usually have anthem-like songs with fantasy-based subject matter and strong choruses, thus creating a theatrical, dramatic and emotionally "powerful" sound. Power metal has two distinct early styles, which developed in parallel. US Power Metal was developed in the mid/late 80s, pioneered by bands such as Omen characterized by harsh thrashy sound and a focus on speed and soaring operatic vocals. It was directly influenced by speed metal and NWOBHM, and had a drop in popularity in the 90s. European Power Metal was developed in the late 80s by key bands such as Helloween, and was more melodic, employing keyboards, synths and anthem-like songs.

#

A

B

C

D

E

F

G

H

I

J

K

L

M

N

O

P

R

S

T

U

V

W

X

Y

Z

See also
List of heavy metal bands

References

External links
 

Power metal
Power metal